Tolmachevka is a rural locality (a village) in Tryapinsky Selsoviet, Aurgazinsky District, Bashkortostan, Russia. The population was 45 as of 2010. There is 1 street.

Geography 
Tolmachevka is located 25 km east of Tolbazy (the district's administrative centre) by road. Veselovka is the nearest rural locality.

References 

Rural localities in Aurgazinsky District